The NIOD Institute for War, Holocaust and Genocide Studies (Dutch: NIOD Instituut voor Oorlogs-, Holocaust- en Genocidestudies) is an organisation in the Netherlands which maintains archives and carries out historical studies into the Second World War, the Holocaust and other genocides around the world, past and present. The institute was founded as a merger of the Netherlands Institute for War Documentation (Dutch: Nederlands instituut voor oorlogsdocumentatie, NIOD, formerly National Institute for War Documentation, Dutch: Rijksinstituut voor oorlogsdocumentatie, RIOD) and the Center for Holocaust and Genocide Studies (CHGS).

It has been part of the Royal Netherlands Academy of Arts and Sciences since 1 January 1999.

Mission
According to its website, the NIOD Institute's mission is to:

It administers the archives of the German occupation of the Netherlands and the Japanese occupation of the Dutch East Indies, as well as large collections of clandestine newspapers and pamphlets, photographs, books and articles.

Studies and publications
The institute published The Kingdom of the Netherlands During World War II (Dutch: Het Koninkrijk der Nederlanden in de Tweede Wereldoorlog) in fourteen volumes and 18,000 pages. This magnum opus of Loe de Jong is the standard reference on the history of the Netherlands during World War II. The NIOD had recently made an electronic edition of the entire work, available for downloading from 11 December 2011, licensed under creative commons CC BY 3.0.

It also performed a study into the Srebrenica massacre of 1995, which led to the report Srebrenica: a 'safe' area, which led to the resignation of the second cabinet of Wim Kok.

Other publications

 Post, Peter / Gijsbers, Harco: The Encyclopedia of Indonesia in the Pacific War. Publisher: Brill, Leiden/Boston, 2010. 
 Withuis, Jolande / Mooij, Annet (eds.): The Politics of War Trauma, The Aftermath of World War II in Eleven European Countries. Publisher: Aksant, Amsterdam, 2010. 
 Boender, Barbara / Haperen, Maria van / Üngör, Ugu: The Holocaust and other genocides. An introduction. Publisher: Amsterdam University Press, Amsterdam, 2012. 
 Adler, Nanci: Keeping Faith with the Party: Communist Believers Return from the Gulag. Publisher: Indiana University Press, Bloomington, 2012. 
 Keizer, Madelon de (ed.) / Bakker, Marjo (ed.) / Griffin, Roger (ed.): Fascism. Journal of Comparative Fascist Studies. Publisher: Brill, Leiden, 2012.

Gallery

See also
Centre for Historical Research and Documentation on War and Contemporary Society - an equivalent institution in Belgium

References

External links
 Official Website (English language)

Archives in the Netherlands
Netherlands in World War II
Research institutes in the Netherlands
Historiography of the Netherlands
Research institutes established in 1945
1945 establishments in the Netherlands
Holocaust studies